Soubakaniédougou is a department or commune of Comoé Province in south-western Burkina Faso. Its capital lies at the town of Soubakaniédougou. According to the 1996 census the department has a total population of 24,136.

Towns and villages
 Soubakaniédougou	(9 423 inhabitants) (capital)
 Badara	(331 inhabitants)
 Damana	(1 205 inhabitants)
 Dougoudioulama	(501 inhabitants)
 Fornofesso	(413 inhabitants)
 Gouera	(1 924 inhabitants)
 Gouindougouba	(1 626 inhabitants)
 Gouindougouni	(1 254 inhabitants)
 Katierla	(787 inhabitants)
 Letiefesse	(1 636 inhabitants)
 Mambire	(435 inhabitants)
 Nafona	(773 inhabitants)
 Panga	(2 263 inhabitants)
 Ziedougou	(1 565 inhabitants)

References

Departments of Burkina Faso
Comoé Province